

The Béchereau SAB C.1 was a French single-seat fighter biplane designed by a team led by Louis Béchereau who had designed biplane fighters for SPAD including the SPAD S.VII.

Design and development
The C.I was a two-bay single-seat fighter biplane powered by a  Hispano-Suiza 8Fb inline piston engine. Without any production facilities the aircraft was built by Levasseur and five aircraft were built and tested during 1918. Following the end of the first world war the aircraft was not developed further and did not enter production.

Specifications

References

1910s French fighter aircraft
Aircraft first flown in 1918